Gentianella fuscicaulis is a species of plant in the Gentianaceae family. It is endemic to Ecuador. Its natural habitats are subtropical or tropical high-altitude shrubland and subtropical or tropical high-altitude grassland.

Sources

Flora of Ecuador
fuscicaulis
Endangered plants
Taxonomy articles created by Polbot